Ira Kent Wells (June 18, 1871 – April 3, 1934) was an American lawyer and a federal judge in Puerto Rico.

Early life and education
Wells was born in Seneca, Kansas. After obtaining a law degree from the University of Kansas

Career
He practiced law in Seneca, Kansas and became involved in politics in that state. Wells served as city attorney of Seneca, Kansas and county attorney of Nemaha County, Kansas. He was a delegate to the Republican National Convention in 1916 and served in the U.S. Army JAG Corps from 1917 to 1920.

In 1921, President Warren G. Harding named Wells as the United States Attorney for Puerto Rico, a position he held until 1924. The following year, President Calvin Coolidge named Wells as judge of the United States District Court for the District of Puerto Rico. Wells served two four-years terms as the sole federal judge in Puerto Rico, being renominated by President Herbert Hoover in 1929. He left office in January 1933 and was succeeded by Robert A. Cooper. Wells died in San Juan, Puerto Rico in 1936.

References

"Ira K. Wells Dead; Ex-Federal Judge", New York Times, April 3, 1934, p. 24.
Guillermo A. Baralt, History of the Federal Court in Puerto Rico: 1899-1999 (2004) (also published in Spanish as Historia del Tribunal Federal de Puerto Rico)

1871 births
1934 deaths
People from Seneca, Kansas
University of Kansas alumni
Kansas lawyers
United States Army Judge Advocate General's Corps
Judges of the United States District Court for the District of Puerto Rico
United States Article I federal judges appointed by Calvin Coolidge
20th-century American judges
Kansas Republicans
Republican Party (Puerto Rico) politicians
United States Assistant Attorneys General for the Environment and Natural Resources Division